Robert Earl is the founder and CEO of Planet Hollywood International, Inc.

Robert Earl may also refer to:

 Robert Earl (judge) (1824–1902), Chief Judge of the NY Court of Appeals
 Robert Earl (singer) (born 1926), English singer
 Robert Earl (U.S. Marine), United States Marine lieutenant colonel
 Bob Earl (born 1950), American racing driver
  Rob Earl, member of The Medway Poets
 Robbie Earl (born 1985), American ice hockey player

See also
 Robert Earle (disambiguation)
 Robert Earl Keen (born 1956), American singer-songwriter and entertainer